Mogo Wildlife Park (formerly Mogo Zoo) is a small privately owned zoo in Mogo, on the south coast of New South Wales, Australia.

Description

Mogo is a member of the Zoo and Aquarium Association and has had success in breeding programs for endangered species, including the Cotton-top tamarin, Black-and-white ruffed lemur, Red panda, and Sumatran tiger. The zoo has one of Australia's largest collections of primates. Unlike most small Australian zoos, Mogo Wildlife Park focuses on exotic species.

Mogo Wildlife Park exhibits  a large African savanna, and a series of islands for primate species. The zoo took over care from some unwanted animals from other collections. During the 1990s, the zoo kept an endangered Kea parrot, the only individual held in any Australian zoo at the time or since, and was also the home of the last Siberian tiger in Australasia (Kuldur, who died in June 1997 aged seventeen). Snow leopards were a long term species at the park (beginning in October 1995) and the park was the first zoo in New South Wales to birth this species when on 20 October 1999 a female cub Sheva and male cub Bhutan were born to parents Lena and Mangar, who had another pair of cubs born at the park on 12 October 2003 (female Tenzin the last Snow leopard at the park who lived for 19 years, and male Khumbu).

In November 2019, Featherdale Wildlife Park bought Mogo Zoo from former owner Sally Padey, and took over full ownership and operations from the end of that month.

Current species at the park

 African lion (including three white-coated)
 Asian small-clawed otter
 Binturong
 Black-and-white ruffed lemur
 Bolivian squirrel monkey
 Brown capuchin monkey
 Caracal
 Cheetah
 Cotton-top tamarin
 Dromedary camel
 Eastern grey kangaroo
 Egyptian goose
 Emperor tamarin
 Fallow deer
 Giraffe
 Golden lion tamarin
 Meerkat
 Palyoora
 Plains zebra
 Pygmy marmoset
 Quokka
 Radiated tortoise
 Red panda
 Ring-tailed lemur
 Serval
 Siamang
 Silvery gibbon
 Southern white rhinoceros
 Spotted hyena
 Sumatran tiger
 Wandering whistling duck
 Western lowland gorilla

The park also keep Asian water buffalo herds which can be sighted in paddock directly north of the zoo grounds viewable on the inland side driving Tomakin Road in the direction towards Princes Highway and Mogo village shops. Orangutan duo Jantan and Willow, originally from Taronga Zoo, whom are of mixed origin of both the Bornean orangutan and the Sumatran orangutan species, are currently not housed in the general public viewing area of the zoo. White-handed gibbons (a female pair) are also housed off display.

References

External links

Zoos in New South Wales
1991 establishments in Australia
Zoos established in 1991
South Coast (New South Wales)